Marek Wierzbicki (1964–present) is a Polish historian. Current scouting activist, former member of the opposition related to the Solidarity movement. Professor and lecturer at the John Paul II Catholic University of Lublin (KUL). Member of the Political Studies Institute of the Polish Academy of Sciences (ISP PAN).

References
 Homepage at the KUL
 Entry at the Encyklopedia Solidarnosci

1964 births
Living people
20th-century Polish historians
Polish male non-fiction writers
Academic staff of the John Paul II Catholic University of Lublin
Polish anti-communists
Polish Scouts and Guides
21st-century Polish historians